Taekwondo at the 2013 Asian Youth Games was held in Longjiang Gymnasium, Nanjing, China between 21 and 22 August 2013.

Medalists

Boys

Girls

Medal table

Results

Boys

53 kg
21 August

62 kg
22 August

Girls

47 kg
21 August

55 kg
22 August

References
Boys 53kg Results
Boys 62kg Results
Girls 47kg Results
Girls 55kg Results

External links
Official Website

2013 Asian Youth Games events
Asian Youth Games
2013 Asian Youth Games